Mikko Vainonen (born 11 April 1994) is a Finnish professional ice hockey defenceman who was last under contract with Glasgow Clan in the Elite Ice Hockey League (EIHL).

Early life
Mikko Vainonen was a hard working defenceman in his childhood. He played a lot of floorball with his friends in residential Helsinki.

Playing career
He made his professional debut playing with HIFK of the SM-liiga during the 2011–12 SM-liiga season. He was selected in the fourth-round, 118th overall, of the 2012 NHL Entry Draft by the Nashville Predators. In the following season and in pursuit of his NHL ambition, he moved to North America to play major junior after he was drafted in the 2012 CHL import draft in the 1st round, 6th overall by the Kingston Frontenacs of the Ontario Hockey League.

In 24 May 2013, he was signed to a three-year entry level contract with the Nashville Predators. Vainonen split time between Nashville's farm teams the Milwaukee Admirals of the American Hockey League and the Cincinnati Cyclones of the ECHL over the next two seasons, before being loaned to Liiga's SaiPa to finish the 2014–15 season.

At the start of the 2015–16 NHL season Vainonen and Nashville agreed to mutually terminate his contract, allowing him to seek employment elsewhere. He returned to his native Finland, coming to terms with Ässät Pori of the top tier Liiga.

After parts of two seasons with German club, Krefeld Pinguine of the Deutsche Eishockey Liga, Vainonen returned again to the Liiga, securing a one-year deal with his fourth Finnish club, Vaasan Sport, on 29 March 2018.

On June 19, 2019, Vainonen opted to continue in the EBEL agreeing to a one-year contract with the Dornbirn Bulldogs.

In a Covid-19 affected 2020-21 season, Vainonen played for Orli Znojmo, HC Frýdek-Místek and Italian side SG Cortina.

In August 2021, Vainonen agreed terms with Scottish EIHL side Glasgow Clan for the 2021-22 season.

Career statistics

Regular season and playoffs

International

References

External links
 

1994 births
Living people
Ässät players
Cincinnati Cyclones (ECHL) players
Dornbirn Bulldogs players
Finnish expatriate ice hockey players in the United States
Finnish ice hockey defencemen
Glasgow Clan players
HC Frýdek-Místek players
HIFK (ice hockey) players
Kingston Frontenacs players
Krefeld Pinguine players
Milwaukee Admirals players
Nashville Predators draft picks
Orli Znojmo players
SaiPa players
SG Cortina players
Ice hockey people from Helsinki
Vaasan Sport players
Finnish expatriate ice hockey players in Scotland
Finnish expatriate ice hockey players in Canada
Finnish expatriate ice hockey players in Italy
Finnish expatriate ice hockey players in the Czech Republic
Finnish expatriate ice hockey players in Austria
Finnish expatriate ice hockey players in Germany